Frank Scott Akins (March 31, 1919 – July 6, 1992) was an American football running back who played for the Washington Redskins of the National Football League (NFL).  He played college football at Washington State University and was drafted in the 30th round of the 1943 NFL Draft.  He taught history and drivers education at Anderson High School, Anderson, CA.

External links
 

1919 births
1992 deaths
American football running backs
People from Teton County, Montana
Washington Redskins players
Washington State Cougars football players
Players of American football from Montana